This is a list of notable people who have lived in Nizhny Novgorod (1932–1990: Gorky), Russia.

Born in Nizhny Novgorod

1301–1800 
 Macarius of Unzha (1349–1444), Russian Orthodox saint
 Dmitry Pozharsky (1577–1642), Rurikid prince, led Russian forces against Polish invaders in 1611–1612 towards the end of the Time of Troubles
 Kuzma Minin (end of 16th century–1616), Russian National Hero of 1612
 Ivan Kulibin (1735–1818), mechanic and inventor
 Sergei Trubetskoy (1790–1860), one of the organizers of the Decembrist movement
 Nikolai Lobachevsky (1792–1856), mathematician and geometer

1801–1850 
 Nikolai Martynov (1815–1875), army officer who fatally shot the poet Mikhail Lermontov in a duel on 27 July 1841
 Pavel Melnikov (1818–1883), writer, ethnographer
 Vasily Vasilyev (1818–1900), sinologist of the Victorian era
 Nikolay Dobrolyubov (1836–1861), literary critic, journalist, poet and revolutionary democrat
 Pyotr Boborykin (1836–1921), writer, playwright, and journalist
 Mily Balakirev (1837–1910), composer, head of The Five
 Nikolai Dmitriev-Orenburgsky (1838–1898), painter
 German Lopatin (1845–1918), revolutionary, journalist and writer
 Raphael von Koeber (1848–1923), German-Russian teacher of philosophy at the Tokyo Imperial University in Japan

1851–1900 
 Mikhail Matyushin (1861–1934), painter and composer
 Constantin Kousnetzoff (1863–1936), painter
 Vladimir Steklov (1864–1926), mathematician, mechanician and physicist
 Anna Ulyanova (1864–1935), revolutionary and Soviet stateswoman
 Zdzisław Lubomirski (1865–1943), Polish aristocrat, landowner, lawyer, conservative politician and social activist
 Dmitriy Sirotkin (1865–1946), twice city head, millionaire
 Aleksandr Ulyanov (1866–1887), revolutionary and older brother of Vladimir Lenin
 Maxim Gorky (Alexei Maximovich Peshkov, 1868–1936), writer and political activist
 Ivan Bubnov (1872–1919), marine engineer and designer of submarines for the Imperial Russian Navy
 Dmitry Nadyozhny (1873–1945), commander in the Russian Imperial Army who later joined the Red Army
 Alexander Samoylovich (1880–1938), Orientalist-Turkologist
 Leonid Vesnin (1880–1933), leading light of Constructivist architecture
 Sergei Chetverikov (1880–1959), biologist and geneticist
 Mikhail Tetyaev (1882–1956), tectonic geologist
 Alexander Krein (1883–1951), composer
 Zinovy Peshkov (1884–1966), Russian-born French general and diplomat
 Yakov Sverdlov (1885–1919), Bolshevik party leader and chairman of the All-Russian Central Executive Committee
 Pyotr Nesterov (1887–1914), military pilot, aircraft technical designer and aerobatics pioneer
 Issay Dobrowen (1891–1953), Russian-Norwegian pianist, composer and conductor
 Nikolay Kolosovsky (1891–1954), economic geographer, economist
 Léon Zack (1892–1980), painter and sculptor
 Nikolai Bulganin (1895–1975), soviet political, Prime Minister (1955–1958), Marshal of the Soviet Union
 Catherine Doherty (1896–1985), Russian Canadian Roman Catholic social worker
 Anatoly Marienhof (1897–1962), poet, novelist and playwright
 Aleksandr Formozov (1899–1973), biologist and environmentalist

1901–1930 
 Sergey Lebedev (1902–1974), scientist in the fields of electrical engineering and computer science, and designer of the first Soviet computers
 Vladimir Varankin (1902–1938), writer of literature in Esperanto, instructor of western European history
 Andrei Fajt (1903–1976), film actor
 Grigory Ginzburg (1904–1961), pianist, Moscow Conservatory professor
 Alexander Golovanov (1904–1975), pilot, Marshal of Aviation
 Nikolay Bogolyubov (1909–1992), theoretical physicist, mathematician
 Boris Mokrousov (1909–1968), composer
 David Ashkenazi (1915–1997), pianist, accompanist and composer
 Nikolai Khokhlov (1922–2007), KGB officer who defected to the United States in 1953
 Yevgeniy Yevstigneyev (1926–1992), soviet actor
 Margarita Nazarova (1926–2005), actress, circus performer
 Yevgeniy Chazov (1929), physician

1931–1950 
 Igor Maslennikov (1931), film director
 Valentin Morkovkin (1933–1999), rower
 Konstantin Kharchev (1934), politician, diplomat and ambassador
 Leonid Volkov (1934), ice hockey player
 Igor Zhukov (1936), pianist, conductor and sound engineer
 Vladimir Ashkenazy (1937), Russian-born pianist and conductor of Icelandic and Swiss citizenship
 Yuri Golov (1937–2014), Russian footballer
 German Sveshnikov (1937–2003), Soviet fencer
 Viktor Konovalenko (1938–1996), ice hockey goaltender
 Sergei Novikov (1938), mathematician
 Mikhail Rabinovich (1941), influential physicist
 Pavel Lednyov (1943–2010), modern pentathlete and Olympic champion
 Valeri Zykov (1944), football player
 Vladimir Denisov (1947), fencer
 Gariy Napalkov (1948), ski jumper
 Tatyana Averina (1950–2001), speed skater

1951–1970 
 Sergey Mitin (1951), Governor of Novgorod Oblast since 2007
 Vladimir Kovin (1954), ice hockey player
 Alexander Skvortsov (1954), ice hockey player
 Galina Kakovkina (1957), painter
 Serhii Plokhii (1957), professor of Ukrainian history at Harvard University
 Mikhail Varnakov (1957), ice hockey player
 Gennadi Maslyayev (1958), professional football coach and player
 Sergey Ryabtsev (1958), plays violin and provides backing vocals for the Gypsy punk band Gogol Bordello
 Tatyana Shvyganova (1960), field hockey player and Olympic medalist
 Evgeny Sheyko (1962), conductor
 Yevgeny Erastov (1963), writer
 Valery Rozov (1964), BASE jumper
 Ilya Segalovich (1964–2013), co-founder of Russian search engine Yandex
 Andrey Sigle (1964), film producer, film music composer and musician
 Maya Usova (1964), ice dancer
 Natalia Pankova (1965), artist, art manager
 Dimitri Konyshev (1966), former road bicycle racer
 Alexander Baburin (1967), Russian-Irish Grandmaster of chess
 Igor Egorov (1968), football referee and former player 
 Dmitri Cheryshev (1969), footballer
 Alexei Ivanov (1969), writer
 Vladimir Kurayev (1969), professional footballer
 Sergei Sorokin (1969), ice hockey player
 Valeri Popovitch (1970), football striker
 Alyaksandr Taykow (1970), footballer

1971–1980 
 Vladislav Leontyev (1971), crime figure
 Dmitry Mazunov (1971), table tennis player
 Natalya Sadova (1972), discus thrower
 Aleksei Gerasimov (1973), professional footballer
 Andrej Krementschouk (1973), photographer
 Albert Oskolkov (1973), professional footballer
 Ilya V. Osipov (1975), entrepreneur, puzzle designer
 Alexander Guskov (1976), professional ice hockey defenceman
 Sergei Nakariakov (1977), virtuoso trumpeter
 Svetlana Ganina (1978), table tennis player
 Evgeny Aleshin (1979), swimmer
 Pyotr Bystrov (1979), association footballer
 Artem Chubarov (1979), professional ice hockey player
 Natalya Bochkareva (1980), stage and film actress, television presenter
 Irina Kotikhina (1980), professional table tennis player

1981–1990 
 Nikolay Kruglov, Jr. (1981), biathlete
 Igor Yamushev (1981), former Russian professional football player
 Dmitry Aydov (1982), professional association football player
 Vladimir Gusev (1982), professional road racing cyclist
 Yekaterina Kondratyeva (1982), sprinter
 Natalia Vodianova (1982), supermodel, philanthropist and occasional film actress
 Ilya Korotkov (1983), javelin thrower
 Sergey Shiryayev (1983), cross country skier
 Ivan Usenko (1983), Belarusian ice hockey defenceman
 Mikhail Tyulyapkin (1984), professional ice hockey defenceman
 Ekaterina Vilkova (1984), actress of film, theater and television
 Dmitri Kosmachev (1985), professional ice hockey player
 Mikhail Varnakov (1985), professional ice hockey player
 Maria Borodakova (1986), volleyball player
 Denis Kornilov (1986), ski jumper
 Denis Kozhukhin (1986), pianist, winner of the Vendome Prize in Lisbon in 2009
 Svetlana Mironova (1986), orienteering competitor
 Vera Ulyakina (1986), volleyball player
 Anne Vyalitsyna (1986), supermodel
 Artem Lobov (1986), UFC Fighter
 Igor Levit (1987), Russian-German pianist
 Ilya Maksimov (1987), football midfielder
 Ruslan Zakharov (1987), short-track speed-skater
 Nikolai Zhilyayev (1987), footballer
 Vladimir Galuzin (1988), professional ice hockey player
 Valeri Zhukov (1988), professional ice hockey player
 Denis Cheryshev (1990), footballer, Valencia CF forward 
 Pavel Karelin (1990–2011), ski jumper

1991–2000 
 Dmitriy Kokarev (1991), swimmer
 Alexander Sharychenkov (1991), professional ice hockey goaltender
 Daniil Trifonov (1991), concert pianist and composer
 Dmitri Karasyov (1992), professional football player
 Ekaterina Pushkash (1992), ice dancer
 Mikhail Maksimochkin (1993), ski jumper
 Danila Chechyotkin (2000), football player

21st century 
 Anton Yefremov (2003), football player
 Daniil Shedko (2003), activist
 Dariia Sergaeva (2004), rhythmic gymnast

Lived in Nizhny Novgorod 
 Damaskin (Rudnev) (1737–1795), Russian Orthodox Church bishop
 Alexander Dubček (1921–1992), Czechoslovak politician, in Nizhny Novgorod 1933–1938
 Nikolay Kruglov (born 1950), biathlete
 Nina Makarova (1908–1976), composer
 Anatoly Moskvin (1968), academic and linguist; arrested in 2011 after the bodies of 26 mummified young women were discovered in his home
 Andrei Rumyantsev (born 1969), professional footballer
 Aleksandr Shchukin (1969–2000), professional footballer (1987–1993: FC Lokomotiv Gorky)
 Igor Shelushkov (born 1946), mental calculator; postgraduate at Gorki Polytechnic Institute (now Nizhny Novgorod State Technical University)

Exiles to Nizhny Novgorod
As a closed city that was inaccessible to foreign observers, this was a city for internal exiles.
 Andrei Sakharov (1980–1989), eminent Soviet nuclear physicist, dissident and human rights activist, 1975 Nobel Peace Prize winner
 Egidio Gennari (1980–1989), Italian exile who left Italy in 1926 due to the repression of the Fascist government and lived in the city

See also 

 List of Russian people
 List of Russian-language poets

Nizhny Novgorod